The Royal Air Force of Oman ( or RAFO) is the air arm of the Armed Forces of Oman.

History

Sultan of Oman's Air Force era
The Sultan of Oman's Air Force (SOAF) was formed with British personnel and aircraft in March 1959. The first aircraft were two Scottish Aviation Pioneers transferred from the Royal Air Force. The first armed aircraft was the Percival Provost T52.

In 1968 the SOAF received the first of 24 BAC Strikemaster jet trainer and light strike aircraft for operation against insurgents in the Dhofar region. In 1974 the SOAF was expanded with orders for the Britten Norman Defender, BAC One-Eleven, BAC VC10 and 32 Hawker Hunter ground attack aircraft. In 1977 Jaguar International joined the SOAF, followed in the 1980s by the BAe Hawk.

Royal Air Force of Oman era

In 1990 the SOAF was renamed the Royal Air Force of Oman (RAFO).  In 1993 and 1994 the RAFO replaced its Hawker Hunters with four BAE Hawk Mk 103 fighter-trainers and 12 single-seat Hawk Mk 203, equipped with Westinghouse APG-66H radar, as light ground attack/interceptors. In September 1997 after the evaluation of new combat aircraft the RAFO decided to upgrade and extend the service lives of its remaining 17 SEPECAT Jaguar ground attack fighters until the second decade of the 21st century. A contract was placed with the United Kingdom Ministry of Defence to upgrade the avionics of the Jaguar aircraft for $40 million. In 2005 deliveries started of the F-16, equipped with improved GPS/INS. The aircraft can carry a further batch of advanced missiles; the AGM-88 HARM missile, JDAM, JSOW and WCMD. Block 50 aircraft are powered by the F110-GE-129 while the Block 52 jets use the F100-PW-229.

On 3 August 2010 the USA Defense Security Cooperation Agency notified Congress of a possible sale of 18 F-16 Block 50/52 to Oman in a contract worth US$3.5 Billion. In addition to the new fighters, the contract included upgrading existing 12 F-16 C/D in the RAFO inventory. On 14 December 2011 it was announced that Oman had agreed to buy an additional 12 F-16C/D Block 50s to join the 12 F-16s C/Ds already in service.

Oman was considering the purchase of either Eurofighter Typhoon or JAS 39 Gripen aircraft, but on 21 December 2012 a £2.5 billion deal was signed in Muscat to supply RAFO with 12 Eurofighter Typhoon fighter jets and eight BAE Hawk Advanced Jet Trainer aircraft, the delivery was complete in 2018.

Bases

Aircraft

Current inventory

Retired
Previous aircraft flown by the Air Force included the SEPECAT Jaguar S/B, Hawker Hunter, BAC Strikemaster, Douglas DC-8, 
Britten-Norman BN-2 Islander, Skyvan 3M, BAe BAC-1-11, Scheibe Super-Falke, and the  Bell 214B helicopter

Commanders
The first Omani to command the Air Force was Air Vice-Marshal Talib bin Meran bin Zaman Al-Raeesi who was appointed in June 1990.

References

External links

The Sultan’s Armed Forces mentioning the Royal Air Force of Oman
World aircraft information files Brightstar publishing File 330 Sheet 1

 
Military of Oman
Oman
Aviation in Oman
Military units and formations established in 1959